Marilyn Taylor Williams (August 12, 1954 - September 9, 2009) was an American Democrat politician from Wappapello, Missouri, who served in the Missouri House of Representatives.

Born in Dexter, Missouri, she attended Dexter public schools, Three Rivers Community College, and Southwest Baptist University.  Williams was a restaurant owner.  She died of cancer in 2009.

References

1954 births
2009 deaths
20th-century American politicians
21st-century American politicians
20th-century American women politicians
21st-century American women politicians
Democratic Party members of the Missouri House of Representatives
Women state legislators in Missouri